is a Japanese voice actress. She retired in the 1990s.

Anime

TV
High School! Kimengumi (Shumi Monozuki)
City Hunter 2 (Seiko (ep. 21))
Maison Ikkoku (misc voices (ep.40))
Urusei Yatsura (Kotori-chan, Nozomi (ep.180), girl (ep.187), misc voices from ep.164 on)

OVA
Bari Bari Densetsu (unknown)

Movies
Cosmo Police Justy (unknown)

References

Japanese voice actresses
Living people
Year of birth missing (living people)